Qulluta (Quechua for mortar, also spelled Collota, Jollota) may refer to:

 Qulluta (Ancash), a mountain in the Huaylas Province, Ancash Region, Peru
 Qulluta (Huancavelica), a mountain in the Huancavelica Region, Peru
 Qulluta (Recuay), a mountain in the Recuay Province, Ancash Region, Peru
 Qulluta (Sihuas), a mountain in the Sihuas Province, Ancash Region, Peru